Tropentarn (tropical camouflage), formerly known as Wüstentarn (desert camouflage), is a camouflage pattern used by the Bundeswehr in arid and semi arid regions. It is the desert variant of the Flecktarn 5-color temperate climate camouflage print of the Bundeswehr.

History
In 2013, it was reported that Denmark had considered the Tropentarn as a replacement for the M84 camouflage pattern. It was decided later on that MultiCam would be used, under the name M/11.

Pattern
Tropentarn's official name is 3-Farben-Tarndruck der Bundeswehr (3-color camouflage print of the Bundeswehr) – Instead of the 5-color scheme of greens, brown, and black of temperate Flecktarn, Tropentarn uses only three colors: a base color of 70% khaki tan with 20% medium brown and 10% dark green spots.

Users

 : Used by Armenian peacekeepers in Afghanistan.

References

Bibliography
 

Bundeswehr
Camouflage patterns
Military equipment of Germany
German military uniforms